"Special Delivery" is a song by American rapper G. Dep. It is the second and final single from his debut album Child of the Ghetto. The song features fellow Bad Boy artist P. Diddy. The accompanying music video for the song was directed by Nick Quested and Harve Pierre.

Music video
Directed by Nick Quested and Bad Boy Records President Harve Pierre, the video features G. Dep, P. Diddy and Black Rob as part of a FedEx-like company called "Bad Boy Express", delivering packages to people via delivery truck.

Remix
The official remix features rappers Ghostface Killah, Keith Murray, Craig Mack, and Sean "Diddy" Combs. It was released as the third single off the remix album We Invented The Remix (2002). It was also featured on the compilation album Bad Boy 20th Anniversary Box Set Edition (2016).

Charts

Peak positions

References

2001 singles
2001 songs
Sean Combs songs
Bad Boy Records singles